The Knights of the Royal Oak was an intended order of chivalry in England. It was proposed in 1660 at the time of the restoration of Charles II of England to be a reward for those Englishmen who had faithfully and actively supported Charles during his nine years of exile in continental Europe. Members of the order were to be called "Knights of the Royal Oak", and bestowed with a silver medal, on a ribbon, depicting the king in the Royal oak tree. This was in reference to the oak tree at Boscobel House, then called the "Oak of Boscobel", in which Charles II hid to escape the Roundheads after the Battle of Worcester in 1651. Men were selected from all the counties of England and Wales, with the number from each county being in proportion to the population. William Dugdale in 1681 noted 687 names, each with a valuation of their estate in pounds per year. The estates of 18 men were valued at more than £3,000 per year. The names of the recipients are also listed in the baronetages, published in five volumes, 1741. Henry Cromwell-Williams, a zealous royalist and first cousin once removed to Oliver Cromwell, was one of the men proposed to be one of these knights.

The order was never established, abandoned out of concerns at the time that it might perpetuate dissension and keep alive the differences between Parliament and the King, which were better left forgotten:

"...it being wisely judged," says Noble, in his 'Memoirs of the Cromwell family', "that the order was calculated only to keep awake animosities, which it was the part of wisdom to lull to sleep."

Instead of individual honours being made, 29 May, Charles' birthday, was set aside as Oak Apple Day (Restoration Day) to commemorate the Restoration. Celebration was made by the wearing of oak leaves in the hat; oak apples gilded, with a few leaves surrounding them, were sold in the streets of London. The statue of Charles I of England, at Charing Cross, was also decorated with branches of oak on this day. The day is still observed in parts of England today. The modern organisation styling itself "Knights of the Royal Oak Society" is not legally recognised as one of the chivalric orders of the United Kingdom.

Knights of the Royal Oak, intended recipients

Bedfordshire 
 Sir William Beecher £1,600
 William Boteler £1,000 
 Sir George Blundell, 2nd Baronet £1,200  
 Francis Crawley £1,000
 Sir John Duncombe £1,000  
 Samuel Ironsides £600 
 William Spencer £1,000 
 Richard Taylor £1,000

Berkshire 
 John Blagrave £2,000 
 Hungerford Dunch £2,000
 John Elwayes £700
 Edmund Fettiplace £700
 John Freeman £800
 Richard Garrard £1,000
 Edward Keyte £1,000
 Sir St. John Moore £1,500
 Colonel Richard Nevil £1,500 
 George Purefoy  £3,000
Sir Compton Read, 1st Baronet  £2000 
 John Whitwicke  £800

Buckinghamshire 
 Thomas Abraham, of Wingrave £600
 Thomas Catesby £800
 – Claver, of Woovinge  £600
 Captain Peter Dayrell  £600
 Charles Dormer  £3,000
 William Dormer  £1,000
 Francis Ingoldsby £1,000
 – Wells, of Lillingston £600

Cambridgeshire 
 Robert Balam of Beaufort Hall £600
 Sir Thomas Bennet Wisbech £2,000
 Thomas Chicheley £2,000 
 William Colvile of Newton £1000
 Thomas Ducket £1,000
 Sir Thomas Leventhorpe, 4th Baronet  £2,000
 Sir Thomas Marsh £1,500
 Captain John Millicent of Bergham  £700 
 Captain Thomas Storey  £800
 Sir Thomas Willys, 1st Baronet £1,000

Cheshire
Thomas Baskerville  £1,000
Thomas Cholmondeley  £2,000
John Crew  £1,000
Roger Grosvenor of Eaton £3,000
Henry Harpur  £600
— Leigh of Lyme £4,000
Sir Thomas Mainwaring, 1st Baronet  £1,000
James Poole  £2,000
Darcie Savage  £1,000
Edward Spencer  £600
Peter Wilbraham  £1,000
Roger Wilbraham  £1,000
Sir Thomas Wilbraham £3,000

Cornwall 
 – Boscowen £4,000
 Francis Buller £3,000
 Piers Edgecumbe £2,000 
 – Ellyott, of Port Eliot
 Colonel – Godolphin £1,000
 Charles Grylls  £700
 – Hallett £800
 Samuel Pendarvis £1,500
 – Penrose £1,000
 James Praed £600
 Edmund Prideaux £900
 Charles Roscarrocke  £800
 Oliver Sawle  £1,000
 William Scawen £800
 Joseph Tredenham £900
 John Vivyan £1,000

Cumberland
Francis Howard £1,500
Colonel Lamplugh £1,000
William Layton   £1,000
Christopher Musgrave  £1,000
Thomas Curwen  £1,000
William Penington  £1,000
Edward Stanley  £600
Wrightington Senhouse  £600

Devon
Sir Copplestone Bamfield of Poltimore    £1,900
Col. Arthur Bassett of Umberleigh    £1,000
Sir William Courtenay of Powderham     £3,000
Sir John Davie, 1st Baronet     £2,000
Sir John Drake, 1st Baronet     £800
Richard Duke of Otterton    £1,000
Francis Fulford of Fulford    £1,000
Col. John Giffard (1602–1665) of Brightley   £1,000
Arthur Northcott     £800
Sir John Northcott, Bt    £1,500
Sir Courtney Pole of Shute    £1,000
Sir John Rolle (d.1706) of Stevenstone      £1,000
John Tuckfield of Little Fulford     £1,000
— Willoughby        £1,700

Dorset
 – Baskervile £1,000
Col. Humphrey Bishop  £800
Capt. Henry Boteler   £600
Thomas Freake   £4,000
Col. Robert Lawrence £700
Woolley Miller   £1,000
John Still  £1,000
Col. Strangwayes  £5,000
 William Thomas   £600
John Tregonwell    £1,100
Sir John Turbervile  £1,500

Durham
Col. William Blakeston   £600
Anthony Byerley    £600
Samuel Davison    £600
Colonel Eden    £1,000
Marke Milbanke   £2,000
Ralph Millett    £600
 John Tempest    £1,000

Essex
Sir William Ayloffe, 3rd Baronet     £1,000
 Capt. Bramston     £1,000
— Clifton of Woodford     £800
Thomas Coates      £1,000
William Knight       £1,000
Thomas Lewther    £1,000
Capt. Charles Maynard    £1,000
Capt. Charles Mildmay     £1,000
Major Scott     £1,000
Henry Woolaston     £1,000
John Wrothe     £1,500

Gloucestershire 
 John Browneinge Esq. £1000
 Duncombe Colchester  £800
 William Cooke £1,000
 John Delabere  £1,000
 Benedict Hall of High Meadow   £4,000
 Sir Humphrey Hanmore (qv Hanham) £1,000
 Sir Humphrey Hooke  £1,500
 William Jones  £800
 Thomas Lloyd   £800
 Thomas Masters    £1,000
 Thomas Morgan  £800
 John Smythe  £1,000
 Richard Stevens  £800

Hampshire
Sir Humphrey Bennet knt £1,000 
Major Edward Cooke £1,500 
Henry Cooke esq the younger £1,000  
Edward Knight esq of Chawton £1,000 
John Norton esq £1,000 
George Pitt esq of Strathfieldsay £4,000 
Sir Henry Titchborne of Titchbourne £1,000
William Wall esq of Crundall £1,000
William Walle esq of Leushott £1,000

Herefordshire
John Barnibee of Boothall    £1,000
Humphrey Baskerville   £1,000
Roger Bodenham,    £2,000
Wallop Brobaston   £1,200
Fitzwilliam Coningsby of Hampton Court  £2,000
Humphrey Cornewall   £6,000
Sir Edward Hopton   £2,500
Henry Lingen    £2,000
Sir Thomas Tomkins    £2,000
Roger Vaughan    £1,500
Thomas Whitney   £2,000
Herbert Westfaling    £800

Hertfordshire
Edward Bashe   £1,500
Edmund Field   £600
John Gore   £600
Ralph Gore   £600
William Gore   £800
— Harrison of Balls    £600
John Jessen    £600
Thomas Keytley    £800
Capt. Thomas Morley    £1,000
Francis Shalcrosse    £800
Peter Soames   £1,500
Edward Watts    £600
Sir Henry Wrothe of Durante, in Enfield, Middlesex   £2,000

Huntingdonshire
 – Apreece esq of Washingley £1,000 
Robert Apreece esq £1,500
Richard Naylor esq £600 
Thomas Rous esq £800 
John Stone esq £1,000
Major Lionel Walden esq £600 
Henry Cromwell-Williams esq of Bodsey £2,000

Kent
Edward Badbye esq £1,000 
John Clinckerd esq £600  
William Delaune knt £2,500 
William Dyke esq £1,000 
Thomas Englishe esq £700 
Humphrey Hide, jun esq £600 
William Kenwricke esq £600 
Thomas Leigh knt £1,500
Stephen Leonard esq £1,000 
Edward Roper esq £2,000
William Roper esq £600 
Sir Richard Sands knt £1,000 
Roger Twisden esq £1,000

Lancashire
Francis Anderton esq £1,000 
Col James Anderton £1,500  
Edmund Asheton esq £1,000
Christopher Banister esq £1,000
Richard Boteler esq £1,000 
— Ffarrington esq of Worden £1,000 
— Fleetwood esq of Penwortham £1,000 
Thomas Greenhalgh esq £1,000 
John Girlington esq £1,000 
Thomas Holt esq £1,000
Robert Holte esq £1,000 
John Ingleton senior esq £1,000 
Colonel Kirby £1,500  
Henry Norris esq £1,200 
Roger Nowell esq £1,000 
Thomas Preston esq £2,000 
Thomas Stanley esq £1,000 
William Stanley esq £1,000 
Edward Tildesley esq £1,000 
 – Walmesley of Dunkenhalgh esq £2,000

Leicestershire
Major Brudnell £1,000 
Capt William Cole £600 
George Dashwood esq £1,000 
Sir George Faunt knt £2,000
William Lawford esq £1,000 
Col Neville of Holt £2,000 
 – Pochin esq of Barkby £1,000  
 – Skevington esq of Skevington £1,000 
Sir Edward Smythe knt £800
William Street esq £1,000 
 – Terringham esq £1,000
Richard Verney esq £1,000 
 – Whaley esq of Norton £1,000

Lincolnshire

William Blythe £1,000
Sir John Browne knt £1,000 
William Broxholme esq £1,000
Sir Robert Carr, 3rd Baronet of Sleford £4,000 
 – Desyad esq of Harleston £1,000
Charles Dymoke esq of Scrivelsby £1,000 
John Hanby esq £1,500 
Jervas Nevill esq £1,200 
Sir John Newton, 2nd Baronet of Hather £3,000
John South esq £2,000 
Capt William Thorold £1,500 
William Welby esq £600

London and Middlesex
Major Matthew Bayley £600
Capt John Bagshawe £600 
Capt Hercules Baron £600
Capt Richard Crane £600 
Robert Blore esq £1,000 
Capt Samuel Clarke £600 
Charles Cheney esq £4,000  
Capt Ralph Clarke £600
Capt Francis Crane £1,000
Col. William Carlos £800
Charles Carryll esq £1,000 
Lt Cox £600 
Alderman Francis Dashwood £2,000 
Henry Englishe esq £2,000 
Col Sir Ralph Freeman knt £1,000 
Col Charles Gifford £600 
William Goldsborough esq £1,500 
Leonard Hamond esq £1,000
Thomas Hughes esq £1,500 
Alderman Francis Knight £2,000
Capt Valentine Knight £1,500 
Commissary General Sir Edward Knightley knt £5,000 
Frances Maunsell esq £600 
Alderman Lewis £2,000
Capt Edward Maunsell £800 
Col Thomas Neville £1,500
Sir Roger Norwich, 2nd Baronet £2,000  
Major Rob Peyton £1,000 
Major Christ Pickeringe £600
Col Charles Progers £600 
Col James Progers £600 
Thomas Reynold esq £2,000 
Sir William Roberts, 1st Baronet of Willesden £1,000 
Colonel Sampson £600
George Skipp esq £600
Alderman Sterlinge £2,000
Col Standish £600  
Robert Thomas esq £3,000 
Morrice Tresham esq £600
George Tresham esq  £600
Edward Turner esq son of Baron Turner  £600
Col Arthur Trevor £1,000 
Thomas Tunman esq £1,000 
Sir Robert Viner knt £3,500 
Peter Vandeput £800 
Col Sir Thos Woodcocke knt £1,000  
Edmund Warcup esq £800 
Capt Joseph Ward £600 
Charles Whitlaker esq £1,000 
Capt Thomas Willowbie £600
Sir Thomas Allen knt £2,000 
Sir Anthony Bateman knt £2,000 
Sir Thomas Bateman knt £2,000 
Sir William Bateman knt £2,000 
Alderman Sir Thomas Bloodworth knt £3,000
Alderman Bonfoy £2,000 
George Cary esq £600 
Sir Richard Chiverton knt £3,000 
Edward Dutton esq £1,000 
Sir James Muddiford knt £1,500 
Edward Palmer esq £800 
Henry Progers esq £600 
Sir Wm Peake knt £1,000  
Thomas Padnall esq £1,000 
Ald Richard Shelbury £1,000
Sir George Smyth knt £2,000 
Sir William Turner knt £2,000 
Ald Thorowgood £2,000 
Samuel Foote esq £1,500 
Alderman Clutterbucke £2,000 
Sir John Lawrence knt £2,000 
Sir John Fredericke knt £2,000 
Alderman Wade £2,000 
Ald Bathurst £2,000 
Sir Francis Compton knt £2,000 
Capt George Gage £600 
Col John Russell £1,000 
Col Thomas Baynton £600 
Sir Thomas Danyell knt £600 
M Gen Randall Elgerton £1,000 
Col Francis Lovelace £600 
Col Morgan £600 
Sir Gilbert Gerrard £600 
Major Henn afterwards Sir Henry Henn £600 
Capt Roger Gardiner £600 
Lieut Hambleton £600 
 – Morgan esq £800 
George Tresham esq £600 
William Washborne esq £600 
Capt Philip Sherrard £600 
Cornet Stanley £1,000  
Hatton Compton esq £600 
Richard Mounteney esq £1,000
Arthur Maunsell £600 
Thomas Hardinge esq £1,500 
Thomas Fisher esq £600 
Nicholas Kemishe esq £600 
Thomas Dacres esq of Cheshunt £1,000 
James Jobson esq £1,000 
John Cowell esq qy Sir John Coe knt one of the Masters in Ch of Depden Suffolk £600 
Henry Kersley esq £600 
Peter Vandeput esq £800 
Richard Raynsford esq a judge £600 
Edward Atkinson esq £1,000
William Barker esq  £1,200
Thomas Elmes esq of Lilford co Northampton  £1,500 
John Keelinge son of Justice Keelinge £600
Wm Haselwood esq of Maidwell £3,000
William Marshall esq  £600
Francis Roper esq  £600
Thomas Waller esq  £1,000

Norfolk
Christopher Bedingfeld esq of Wyghton £800
Osburne Clarke esq £1,000 
John Coke esq £1,000
Thomas Garrard esq £1,000
John Hobart esq of Blickling and Intwood £1,000
Christopher Jug esq £1,500 
John Kendall esq of Thetford £1,000 
Sir Thomas Meddowe knt of Yarmouth £2,000 
John Nabbes esq £2,000  
Richard Nixson esq £1,000 
Lawrence Oxborow esq of Hackbech Hall £800  
William Paston esq of Paston £800  
Sir Joseph Payne knt of Norwich £1,000 
Valentine Saunders esq £600 
Capt Henry Stewart £1,000
John Tasburgh esq £600 
Sir Charles Waldegrave, 3rd Baronet £2,000 
Robert Wright esq £1,000 
Thomas Wright esq of Kilverston £1,000 
John Wyndham esq of Felbrigge £3,500

Northamptonshire
John Adams esq £1,000 
 – Arundel esq of Stoke £1,000 
George Clarke esq of Watford £3,000 
Edward Palmer esq £1,200 
Bryan Johnson esq £1,000 
Walter Kirkham esq of Fineshade Abbey £800 
Francis Lane esq £600 
Thomas Morgan esq £600
Tanfield Moulso esq of Thingdon £600 
Humphrey Orme esq of Peterboro £1,000 
 – Ouley esq of Catesby £1,000 
William Stafford esq of Blatherwick £3,000 
William Tate esq of Delapre £1,500 
Francis Thursby esq of Abington £1,000 
John Willoughby esq £600

Northumberland
Thomas Beewicke esq £2,000
Daniel Collingwood esq £600 
George Collingwood esq £800
Sir William Foster knt £1,000 
Sir Thomas Horseley knt £1,000 
Charles Howard esq £600 
Robert Shafto esq £1,000 
 – Thometon esq of Netherwhitton £800

Nottinghamshire
Cecil Cooper esq of Thurgarton £1,000 
Sir John Curzon, 1st Baronet £500
 – Eyre esq of Mansfield Woodhouse £2,000 
 – Middleton esq £1,000 
John Palmer esq £600 
 – Whaley esq £1,200

Oxfordshire
Sir John Clarke £2,000 
Sir Anthony Cope, 4th Baronet £4,000 
 – Gardiner esq of Tew £800 
James Herne esq £1,000 
Sir Henry Jones knt £1,500 
Sir Francis Henry Lee, 4th Baronet £3,000  
Rowland Lucey esq £1,600 
Sir Francis Norris £1,500  
Sir Thomas Penyston, 2nd Baronet £800 
Matthew Skinner esq £600 
Welsborne Sill esq £600 
Thomas Stoner esq £3,000
Sir Timothy Tynell £1,500 
Cuthbert Warcupp esq £1,000
Sir Francis Wenman knt £1,500 
George Wenman esq £2,000

Rutland
Abel Barker esq 1000
Christopher Browne esq 600 
Samuel Browne esq 600  
Edward Fawkenor esq of Uppingham 1600 
Richard Halford esq of Ediweston 600 
Henry Noel esq 1000

Shropshire
Francis Charleton esq  £2,000
Thomas Cornwall esq £500
Henry Davenport esq £800
Andrew Forrester esq £1,000
Richard Fowler esq £1,000
John Kynnaston esq £1,000
Robert Leighton esq £800
Charles Mainwaringe esq £600
Andrew Newport esq £800
William Oakeley esq £800
Col William Owen £800
Thomas Talbott esq £1,000
George Weld esq  £1,000
Thomas Whitmore esq £600
Sir John Wylde knt £1,000

Somerset
Warwick Bamfield esq £1,000 
Sir William Basselt of Claverton £1,800 
Edward Berkley esq £1,000 
Samuel Gorges esq £600 
John Hall esq £900   
John Carey esq £1,500  
John Hunt esq £1,500 
  – Lacey esq of Hartley £1,000  
Francis Luttrell esq £1,500 
Sir George Norton knt £1,800
Peregrine Palmer esq £1,500 
John Pawlet esq £1,000
Edward Phelips esq £1,500
George Stawell esq £5,000
John Tint esq £1,000

Staffordshire
Capt Francis Biddulph £600
Richard Congreve esq £600
Johnathan Cope esq £800
Charles Cotton esq £600
Walter Fowler esq  £1,500 
Walter Gifford esq £1,500
Henry Grey esq of Envile  £1,000
Colonel Lane £700
 Francis Leveson esq £2,000
Robert Leveson esq £600
Richard Oakover esq £1,000
Edwin Scrumshire esq £1,000
Thomas Whitgrave esq  £600

Suffolk
William Barker esq £600  
Capt Bennett £1,000 
William Blomfield esq £600 
Joseph Brand esq of Edwardston £1,000
John Brookes esq £1,000 
Richard Cooke esq £1,000 
Robert Crane esq £1,500
John Gibbes esq £800 
Clement Higham esq £1,000 
Roger Kedington esq £800 
Sir Edmund Poley knt £1,000 
Edmond Sheppard esq £1,000
Charles Stutteville esq of Dalham £1,500
Robert Style esq £600 
John Warner esq £1,000 
Henry Warner esq £1,000 
Randall Williams esq £600

Surrey
Capt Bartholomew £600 
Richard Berry esq £1,000 
Charles Bickerstaffe esq £600 
Thomas Brand esq £700 
Edward Bromfeild esq £1,000 
Sir Adam Browne, 2nd Baronet £1,600 
George Browne esq £600 
Capt Roger Clarke £600 
John Dawes esq £700 
Thomas Delmahoy esq £1,200 
George Duke esq £600 
Roger Duncombe esq £1,000 
Giles Dunster esq £600 
Edward Evelyn esq of Ditton £600 
Sir John Evelyn, 1st Baronet, of Godstone £1,800 
Charles Good esq £700 
James Gresham esq £800 
Capt John Holmendon £600 
Edward Moore esq £600 
William Muschamp esq of Roebarnes £600 
Roger Pettyward (Pettiward) esq of Putney, Surrey, £2,000 
Peter Quinnall esq £600 
Vincent Randall esq £1,000 
Geo Smyth esq £600 
White Titchbourne esq £1,000 
  — Thomas esq of Cobham £600 
George Turner esq £1,000 
Geo Vernon esq of Farnham £800 
Geo Woodroffe esq of Poyle £1,500 
Edward Woodward esq £1,000 
Davis Wymondswold esq of Putney £2,000 
James Zouch esq £2,000

Warwickshire
John Bridgman esq £1,000 
Thomas Broughton esq of Lawford £800 
William Combes esq £800 
William Dylke esq of Maxstoke Castle £800 
Thomas Flint esq £700 
  — Jenings esq of Bromesbam £1,000 
  — Keyte esq of Camden £1,000 
  — Middlemore esq of Edgebaston £2,000 
Edward Peyton esq £1,800 
Capt Geo Rawley £700 
Seabright Reppington esq £1,000 
  — Sheldon esq of Beoley £2,000 
John Stratford esq £1,000 
Richard Verney esq of Compton £600 
William Wood esq £800

Westmorland
Allan Bellingham esq £1,500
Richard Braythwaite esq £600 
Sir Thomas Braythwaite knt £1,500 
Thomas Cabetas esq £600 
Christ Crackenthorpe esq £600 
John Dalston esq £600  
James Duckett esq £800 
Daniel Fleminge esq £1,800 
Thomas Leybourne esq £600 
John Lowther esq £4,000 
John Otway esq £600

Wiltshire
Thomas Baskervile esq £1,200
William Boddenham esq £600  
George Bond esq £800 
Walter Buckland esq £900 
John Bowles esq £600 
William Duckett esq £1,000 
Sir John Ernley knt £1,000
John Gore esq £600 
John Holte esq £800 
Richard Grubham Howe esq £1,200
Edward Hyde esq £600 
Oliver Nicholas esq £1,000  
John Norden esq £800 
Sir John Scroope knt £700
William Willoughby esq £600

Worcestershire
William Acton esq £1,000 
Sir Rowland Berkeley knt £1,000 
Philip Brace esq £600 
Henry Bromley £1,000 
Thomas Child esq £2,000 
Sir Henry Lyttelton, 2nd Baronet of Frankley £3,000 
Matthew Morphew esq £1,000 
Sir William Russell, 1st Baronet, of Wytley £2,000 
Samuel Sandys esq of Umbersley £1,000 
Thomas Savage esq of Elmley Castle £800 
  – Sheldon esq of Broadway   £600 
Francis Sheldon esq £600 
Sherrington Talbott esq £1,000 
Joseph Walsh esq £1,000 
Major Thomas Weld £600 
Sir John Woodford knt £2,000

Yorkshire
Francis Bayldon esq £600 
John Beilby esq £1,000 
Major John Beverley £600 
Barrington Bourchier esq £1,000 
John Calverley esq of Calverley £1,000 
Walter Calverley esq £1,000 
Nicholas Chaloner esq £600 
Marmaduke Constable esq £1,000 
Thomas Danby esq £3,000 
Robert Doldon esq £600 
Capt John Garnett £600 
Richard Hutton esq £1,000 
James Moyser esq £1,000 
William Osbaldiston esq £1,000 
  – Pennyman esq £1,000 
Thomas Tancred esq £800 
Edward Trotter esq £1,000 
Major Vavasor of Weston £600 
Sir Walter Vavasor knt £1,000 
Sir Christ Wandesford knt £2,000

Wales 
Anglesey
 – Bodden, Esq.  £1,000
 William Bould, Esq. £1,000
 Pierce Lloyd, Esq. £1,000
 John Robinson, Esq.  £800
 Thomas Wood, Esq.  £600

Brecknockshire 
 Richard Gwynn, Esq. £600
 John Jefferys, Esq. £600
 Walter Vaughan, Esq. £700
 Wilbourne Williams, Esq. £600

Cardiganshire
 John Jones, Esq.   £800
 Thomas Jones, Esq. £600
 Reynold Jenkins, Esq.  £700
 James Lewis  £700
 Edward Vaughan, Esq.  £1,000
Carmarthenshire 
 Altham (John?) Vaughan, Esq. £1,000
 Philip Vaughan, Esq.  £600
 Henry Maunsell, Esq. £700
 Rowland Gwynn, Esq. £899
 Charles Vaughan, Esq. £600
 William Gwynn, Esq. £700
 Nicholas Williams, Esq.  £1,000
 Richard Gwynn, Esq. £700

Caernarvonshire 
 Sir John Owen's heir £1,500

Denbighshire 
 Charles Salisburie, Esq. £1,300
 Huscall Thelwall, Esq. £600
 Foulke Middleton, Esq. £600
 John Wynn, Esq. £600
 Sir Thomas Middleton, Knt. (of Chirk Castle, Wrexham) £600
 Bevis Lloyd, Esq. £600
 John Lloyd, Esq. £600

Flintshire

 Sir Roger Mostyn, 1st Baronet, of Mostyn  £4,000
 Sir Edward Mostyn, Knt £1,500
 – Salisbury, of Hegragge, Esq.   £600
 Robert Davies, Esq.  £2,000
 John Puliston, Esq.  £2,500
 Sir Thomas Hanmer, 2nd Baronet  £3,000
 William Hanmer, Esq.

Glamorganshire 
 Sir – Esterlinge, Knt. £2,000
 Herbert Evans, Esq. £1,500
 David Jenkins, Esq. £1,500
 Thomas Mathews, Esq. £1,100
 William Bassett, Esq. £800
 William Herbert, Esq.  £1,000
 Edmund Lewis, Esq. £800
 David Mathews, Esq. £1,000

Merionethshire 
 – Attwyll, of Parke, Esq. £1,500
 Lewis Owen, Esq. £600
 John Lloyd, Esq. £600
 William Vaughan, Esq. £1,200
 William Salesbury, Esq.  £800
 William Price, Esq. £1,500
 Howell Vaughan, Esq. £800

Monmouthshire
 William Morgan, Esq. £4,000
 William Jones, of Lanarthe, Esq.  £1,000 
 Thomas Lewis, Esq. £1,000
 Charles Vann, Esq. £800
 Walter Rumsey, Esq. £600
 William Jones, of Llantrischent, Esq. £600
 – Milbourne, Esq.  £800

Montgomeryshire 
 John Pugh, Esq. £1,000
 – Owen, Esq., of Ruserton  £1,000
 – Blaney, Esq.  £1,000
 Roger Lloyd, Esq. £800
 Richard Owen, Esq.  £800
 Richard Herbert, Esq. £700
 Sir Edward Lloyd  £1,200
 Edmund Waring, Esq. £700

Pembrokeshire
 Thomas Langhorne, Esq.  £800
 Lewis Wogan, Esq. £1,000
 Hugh Bowen, Esq. £600
 Essex Merricke, Esq.  £600
 Sir John Lort, Knt. (Bart. after) £2,000

Radnorshire 
 George Gwynne £1,500
 Evan Davies £600
 – Price, Esq. £1,000

See also
 Escape of Charles II
 Oak apple
 Royal Oak (tree)

Footnotes

References 
  John Burke A genealogical and heraldic History of the Commoners of Great Britain, Volume 1
 William Dugdale, The antient Usage in bearing of such ensigns of honour as are commonly call'd Arms. With a catalogue of the present Nobility of England, 1681, reprinted 1811, London
 British History Online, Knights of the Royal Oak
 Knights of the Royal Oak Society
 Davies, Reverend Walter, The English Works of Rev. Walter Davies, M.A.), Oxford University Press, 1868
 Gloucestershire Notes and Queries: An Illustrated Quarterly Magazine Devoted to the History and Antiquities of Gloucestershire, Edited by William Phillimore Watts Phillimore, Sidney Joseph Madge, Published by Simpkin, Marshall, Hamilton, Kent, and Co., Ltd., 1884
 Frederick William Fairholt, Thomas Dekker, Thomas Heywood, Thomas Jordan, John Tatham, Lord Mayors' pageants: being collections towards a history of these annual celebrations, with specimens of the descriptive pamphlets, for the Percy Society by T. Richards, 1844
 Oxford Historical Society Publications, Vol. 44, Clarendon Press for the Oxford Historical Society, 1904
 Mark Noble, Memoirs of the protectoral-house of Cromwell, vol. I, online text, p. 70,

Royal Oak
Wales-related lists